Bawtree is a surname. Notable people with the surname include: 

Adrian Bawtree (born 1968), English composer and organist
David Bawtree (born 1937), British naval officer
John Bawtree (1873–1938), English cricketer
Leonard Bawtree (1924–2014), Canadian politician
Michael Bawtree (born 1937), Canadian actor, director, author, and educator